Three Anchor Bay is a suburb of Cape Town in the Western Cape province of South Africa.

Small anchorage in Table Bay. The name, first encountered in 1661, possibly refers to anchors securing chains stretched as defence across the bay. The form Drieankerbaai is preferred for official purposes.

Afrikaans language author and poet Ingrid Jonker drowned herself at the nearby beach on July 19, 1965.

The National Sea Rescue Institute is headquartered there.

In the period May 2020 through February 2021 there were 25 apartments sold in the suburb at an average price of R 34361 / m²

References
4. Lance Real Estate Three Anchor Bay Property Review

Suburbs of Cape Town